Shangri-La is a four-part television documentary miniseries, directed by Morgan Neville and Jeff Malmberg, that aired on Showtime from July 12 to August 2, 2019. The series concerns the Shangri-La recording studio in Malibu, California and its owner, record producer and Def Jam Records co-founder Rick Rubin. A "work-in-progress" cut of the docuseries was screened at the 2019 SXSW Festival.

The miniseries was nominated for Best Music Film at the 62nd Annual Grammy Awards.

Cast

Main
 Rick Rubin

Reenactments
 David Pluebell as Young Rick
 Rowan Smyth as Kid Rick
 Joseph Yokozuna Fatu as Wrestler Rick
 David Nesler as Young Rick Magician (Hands)
 Jill Galbraith as Nancy Heller

Other
 Joel Bennett as Beachcomber

Critical reception
Review aggregator Rotten Tomatoes surveyed 11 critical responses and judged 100% of them to be positive, with an average rating of 7.3 out of 10. The website's critical consensus reads, "A refreshingly chill music documentary, Shangri-La provides an insightful -- if not exactly revelatory -- peak  into the private world of producer Rick Rubin."

Time called the series "flawed but sublime."

Tim Goodman of The Hollywood Reporter called the miniseries "inspiring and oddly riveting" and said, "There is more creativity, weirdness, thoughtfulness and ambition — both achieved and failed — in the new Showtime docuseries Shangri-La than in a good portion of recent TV dramas." Goodman also felt, however, that series should have got "a little dirtier and messier in the examination" of Rubin's mid-career years.

On November 20, 2019, the miniseries was nominated for the Grammy Award for Best Music Film at the 62nd Annual Grammy Awards.

Episodes

References

External links

2010s American documentary television series
2019 American television series debuts
2019 American television series endings
Documentary television series about music
Rick Rubin
Showtime (TV network) original programming
Television shows set in Malibu, California